M.Y.S. Prasad is an Indian scientist and the former director of the Satish Dhawan Space Centre Sriharikota Range (SDSC-SHAR). Govt. of India’s Civilian Award Padma Shri for the year 2014 for his distinguished service in Science and Technology.

Profile of Dr. M.Y.S. Prasad 
M.Y.S. Prasad Distinguished Scientist (APEX), ISRO & Director, SDSC SHAR, Sriharikota.

Retired on 31 May 2015 as Director of Satish Dhawan Space Centre SHAR (SDSC-SHAR) of ISRO.
Regular Employee strength of SDSC is 2100, and annual Budget Rs. 500 Crores
DS (APEX) is Secretary to Government of India Grade since 1 May 2013.
He is currently serving as the Vice-Chancellor in India's one of the top private universities, Vignan's University located in Guntur district of Andhra Pradesh.

Academic Qualifications and Experience
Bachelor of Engineering (Electronics and Communications) in 1974 from Government College of Engineering, Kakinada. 
Ph.D. from BITS, Pilani in the subject of "Interference in Satellite Communications" in 2005.
39 years of experience in Indian Space Program, Steering various activities and programs in different Centres and Units.

Positions held in ISRO
Director of SDSC SHAR, Sriharikota, AP                               : Jan 2013 to 31 May 2015
Associate Director SDSC SHAR                                         : 2008 to Dec2012
Deputy Director SAC, Ahmedabad                                       : 2005 to 2008
Director DECU, Ahmedabad	                                      : 2006 to 2008
Director MCF Hassan, Karnataka                                       : 1999 to 2005
Associate Director MCF                                               : 1998 to 1999
Deputy Project Director PSLV, Thiruvananthapuram                     : Nov 1997 to Oct 1998
Counsellor (Space), Embassy of India – Paris, FRANCE                 : 1994 to 1997 
Deputy Project Director ASLV & Project Manager-Avionics ASLV, VSSC   : 1982 to 1994
Project Engineer SLV-3, VSSC Thiruvananthapuram, Kerala              : 1975 to 1982
Worked in launch vehicle development, communication satellite operations, communication payload and ground systems development, international assignments, and presently in Launch Vehicle Operations Centre.  Managed all areas with in-depth technical knowledge and enhanced teamwork.

Major Contributions

Technology
Control of preparation, final operations and Launch of all PSLV and GSLV launches since 2008 at SDSC SHAR Seventeen PSLV and three GSLV Launches.
Handled many emergencies in Real time during Launch preparations, including a large Leak of Propellant in GSLV-D5 first launch attempt in August 2013. 
Contributed extensively to the Failure Analysis of GSLV-F06 and GSLV-D3 Missions.
Commissioning of 9 GSO Satellite Missions from MCF, Regular operations and Emergency operations connected with many on-orbit Satellite anomalies.
Handled major emergency of INSAT-2E Satellite, and guided the Team to operate the Spacecraft through many innovative methods for its complete mission life of 12 years.
Introduced On-Board Computers into Launch Vehicles starting from ASLV.
Proposed, introduced, qualified and made operational a system in all Launch Vehicles called "Realtime Decision System in the Flight Sequencing" – which is a key element for all Launch Vehicle successes.
Introduced Design, Tests, Analysis and Solutions for all Electromagnetic Interference (EMI) problems in Launch Vehicles.

Infrastructure
Created and commissioned New Master Control Facility at Bhopal for GSO Satellite operations.
Augmented MCF Hassan Ground Stations and Control Centre to operate 20 Satellites simultaneously.
Created Satellite based Disaster Management Communication System - with 22 User Nodes, 15 Disaster Monitoring and Decision making Nodes, and with Hub at New Delhi.
Planned and realised Satellite Communication Link to connect Indian Antarctica Research Station Maithri to Goa.
Lead the Team to realise New Mission Control Centre at SDSC SHAR.
Lead the Team to realise Acoustic Suppression System at Second Launchpad at SDSC SHAR.
Conceived, Planned, Designed, and presently guiding a large active phased array antenna based beam steering radar for Multi Object Tracking. Project costing Rs. 260 Crores is nearing completion.

International Experience
He has worked for four years in Paris as Counsellor (Space) and Networked many International Aerospace Professionals for the benefit of ISRO.
Represented India (& ISRO) in the United Nations Committee On Peaceful Uses of Outer Space (UN-COPUOS) for 11 years from 1996-2006.
Member of the Working Group which evolved "UN Space Debris Mitigation Guidelines", adopted by UN General Assembly in December 2007.
Elected as Member of International Academy of Astronautics (IAA) in 2008. Currently Member of IAA Awards Committee.
Worked as the Vice-President of International Astronautical Federation (IAF) for 4 years from 2006-2010.
Elected as Member of International Institute of Space Law (IISL).
Visited Aerospace Organisations and Companies in the following Countries during the last 20 years : USA, France, Germany, Italy, U.K., Scotland, Austria, Netherlands, Belgium, Norway, Czech Republic, Hungary, Tunisia, French Guiana, Singapore, South Korea, Japan, China, Canada. This exposure helped to network a large number of Space Professionals, and also to observe their models of working with close understanding.

Awards and recognition
Kannada Rajyotsava award in the field of Science, 2001.
ISRO Merit award for in Orbit Management of Geo-stationary Satellites 2007.
ISRO Team Excellence award for Operations of INSAT-2E, 2007.
Selected and elected as Member of International Academy of Astronautics (IAA) in 2008
ISRO Team Excellence award as the Leader of the team for Satellite based Disaster Warning and Communication Systems, 2009.
ISRO Team Excellence award for EDUSAT Utilisation Programme, 2009.
ISRO Team Excellence award as Team Leader for Development of Innovative Launch Facilities, 2011.
"Professor Nayudamma" Award for 2013.
Lifetime Achievement Award in Space Technologies by Arunai Engineering College, Tamil Nadu, in 2013.
Honorary doctorate from Jawaharlal Nehru Technological University, Kakinada in June, 2013.
Govt. of India’s Civilian Award Padma Shri for the year 2014.
Vikram Sarabhai Memorial Award 2014–15 by the Indian Science Congress Association.  
Enrolled in the Institution of Electronics & Telecommunication Engineers (IETE) as Fellow and Honoured with Diamond Jubilee Medal – 2014 for outstanding contribution in the field of Electronics, Communication, IT.
International Academy of Astronautics (IAA) Laurels for Team Award-2013, as Technology Leader in Chandrayaan-I Mission.
Honorary Doctorate from Vignan University, Guntur for the year 2014.
 Honorary advisor at Egnify Technologies Pvt.Ltd.

Publications and public outreach
40 publications in various Indian and international journals and international conferences.
Delivered more than 60 invited lectures on different areas of space field in various universities/engineering colleges.
Taught satellite communication subject for M.Tech. students.

References

See also
 Indian Space Research Organisation

Living people
Indian aerospace engineers
Indian Space Research Organisation people
Satish Dhawan Space Centre
1953 births
Engineers from Andhra Pradesh
Recipients of the Padma Shri in science & engineering
20th-century Indian engineers